Palmer Edward Havens (November 24, 1818 in Moriah, Essex County, New York – September 4, 1886 in Essex, Essex Co., NY) was an American politician from New York.

Life
He was the son of Deacon John Havens (1791–1836) and Aurilla (Pratt) Havens (1785–1860). He attended the common schools, then taught school for ten years. At the same time, he studied law with Henry H. Ross, was admitted to the bar in 1843, and practiced in Essex. In 1841, he married Betsy E. Putnam (died 1872), and they had two children. He was at times Superintendent of Common Schools, Town Clerk, and Supervisor of the Town of Essex.

He was a member of the New York State Assembly (Essex Co.) in 1862 and 1863; of the New York State Senate (16th D.) in 1864 and 1865; and again of the State Assembly in 1867.

On February 17, 1873, he married Jane M. (Ismon) Edwards.

Sources
 The New York Civil List compiled by Franklin Benjamin Hough, Stephen C. Hutchins and Edgar Albert Werner (1870; pg. 443, 495, 498 and 506)
 Biographical Sketches of the State Officers and the Members of the Legislature of the State of New York in 1862 and '63 by William D. Murphy (pg. 333f)
 Life Sketches of the State Officers, Senators, and Members of the Assembly of the State of New York in 1867 by S. R. Harlow & H. H. Boone (pg. 259ff)
 Obit transcribed at GenForum
 Havens genealogy at Family Tree Maker

1818 births
1886 deaths
Republican Party New York (state) state senators
People from Moriah, New York
Republican Party members of the New York State Assembly
Town supervisors in New York (state)
19th-century American politicians